Alena Bílková (born 13 September 1946) is a Czech printmaker and glass artist.

Bílková was born in Usti nad Labem and initially studied at the Secondary School of Applied Arts for Glassmaking in Železný Brod. During her career she has exhibited extensively across the Czech Republic. At the Academy of Arts, Architecture and Design in Prague she undertook further studies with Stanislav Libenský. Long married to artist and restorer Michael Bílek, she often exhibited jointly with him. During her career she has been active mostly as a printmaker.

A 1990 mixed-media work by Bílková, Z Cyklu voda "svetla"/From the Cycle Water "Light", is owned by the National Gallery of Art.

References

1946 births
Living people
Czech printmakers
Women printmakers
Glass artists
Women glass artists
20th-century Czech artists
20th-century Czech printmakers
20th-century Czech women artists
21st-century Czech artists
21st-century printmakers
21st-century Czech women artists
Academy of Arts, Architecture and Design in Prague alumni